Peter Mumby (born 22 February 1969) is an English retired professional footballer who played as a striker.

Mumby signed for Shamrock Rovers on loan in January 1989 and scored on his League of Ireland debut at Oriel Park on the 29th. In his next appearance, he wrote himself into the history books by scoring a hat-trick against rivals Bohemian F.C. He was on target again the following week as Rovers beat Home Farm in a FAI Cup quarter final replay. His last goal for The Hoops was in a FAI Cup semi final second leg against Derry City. He scored a total of 6 in 9 total appearances for Rovers.

Afterwards, Burnley returned to sign for Noel King at Limerick F.C. in August 1992. Mumby scored in the 1992/93 FAI League Cup Final as Limerick defeated St Patrick's Athletic 2-0 to win his only senior medal.

Honours
 League of Ireland Cup:
 Limerick FC - 1992/93

References

Peter Mumby career stats at the Post-War Players Database

1969 births
Living people
English footballers
Association football forwards
Leeds United F.C. players
Burnley F.C. players
Bradford (Park Avenue) A.F.C. players
English Football League players
Shamrock Rovers F.C. players
Limerick F.C. players
League of Ireland players
Footballers from Bradford
Expatriate association footballers in the Republic of Ireland